Feucht station is a railway station in the northwest of the municipality of Feucht, located in the Nürnberger Land district in Middle Franconia, Germany. The station is located at the junction of three Deutsche Bahn railway lines: Feucht–Altdorf, Nuremberg–Feucht, and Nuremberg–Regensburg.

References

Nuremberg S-Bahn stations
Railway stations in Bavaria
Railway stations in Germany opened in 1871
1871 establishments in Bavaria
Buildings and structures in Nürnberger Land